The Oxford American is a quarterly magazine that focuses on the American South.

First publication
The magazine was begun in late 1989 in Oxford, Mississippi, by Marc Smirnoff (born July 11, 1963). 

The name "Oxford American" is a play on The American Mercury, H. L. Mencken's general interest magazine which Smirnoff long admired. The magazine's debut issue was published on Saturday, March 14, 1992. The cover of the first issue featured a fire-engine red background with white text and a "photo-realistic" painting by Oxford painter Glennray Tutor of an abandoned gasoline pump. Three more issues were published, including one featuring previously unpublished photographs by Eudora Welty. The magazine then ceased publication in mid-1994 for lack of funding.

Second and third publication
In April 1995, author and Oxford resident John Grisham secured financing to bring the magazine back into publication. The magazine had a new look and was printed on coated paper stock with a higher page count and new advertisers. In 2000, Grisham published a serialized version of A Painted House in the Oxford American.  Although the magazine had a successful following, it was still not a successful business venture and in September 2001 stopped publication for a second time.

The magazine began its third incarnation in late 2002 and was headquartered in Little Rock, Arkansas. The magazine was published in conjunction with the AtHome, Inc., group of magazines. Due to insufficient advertising revenue, it again stopped publication in late 2003.

Present incarnation
After $500,000 in financing was secured, the University of Central Arkansas in Conway, Arkansas, assumed the role as publisher and the magazine began publication once again in December 2004 as a quarterly. The magazine's editorial offices are on the first floor of Main Hall on the university grounds.

In 2008, a business secretary was discovered to have been embezzling money from the magazine since 2007. The secretary, who reported to the magazine's publisher Ray Wittenberg, pleaded guilty to theft and forgery and was briefly imprisoned and ordered to pay $102,000 in restitution to the magazine.

In the aftermath of the embezzlement, the University of Central Arkansas demoted Wittenberg, loaned the magazine additional funds and assumed control of the business operations of the magazine, instituting the university's spokesman, Warwick Sabin, as publisher.

In February 2009, a "mystery donor" gave the magazine $100,000 to repay the IRS debt incurred as a result of the embezzlement.

In July 2012, a few weeks before Issue 78 of the magazine was published, several editorial employees (including a recently fired senior editor and a recently fired intern) made allegations of sexual harassment against founder/editor Marc Smirnoff and managing editor Carol Ann Fitzgerald. Within a week, the two were fired and publisher Warwick Sabin became interim editor. Smirnoff and Fitzgerald denied the allegations made against them and said they were not given a chance to defend themselves. One reporter concluded that "The Oxford American board didn’t have any clear misbehavioral conduct by Sminoff with which to warrant termination." Smirnoff and Fitzgerald maintain that the allegations against them were the retaliatory actions of disgruntled employees and that they were not given a chance to defend themselves.

In September 2012, when Roger D. Hodge replaced Warwick Sabin as the magazine's editor, Samir Husni, a journalism professor at the University of Mississippi and a former consultant to the magazine speculated on the uncertain future of the "iconic" magazine without its founder, Smirnoff. In December 2012, the New York Times remarked that Smirnoff had been 'the most important editor out of the South since Willie Morris."  Hodge stepped down in May 2015. In October 2015, Eliza Borné was named editor.

In October 2012, the Oxford American and the University of Central Arkansas renewed its alliance for five years on the understanding that the magazine will repay its debt, currently at $700,000, to the university. The magazine's chairman of the board, Richard N. Massey, pledged to repay the debt at a rate of about $69,000 a year over about five years. In January 2016, Ryan Harris was named Executive Director of the Oxford American Literary Project, the non-profit organization that publishes the magazine. In 2017, the Oxford American Literary Project announced the Oxford American Jeff Baskin Writers Fellowship, "to support the writing of a debut book of creative nonfiction." Molly McCully Brown was named the inaugural recipient of the fellowship, which includes a $10,000 living stipend, housing, and an editorial apprenticeship with the Oxford American.

The magazine has won four National Magazine Awards, including a National Magazine Award in General Excellence (in February 2016), and is noted for its annual Southern music issue, which includes a complimentary CD. It has also featured previously unpublished work by William Faulkner, Margaret Walker, James Agee, and James Dickey. In 2017, the magazine published a special 25th anniversary issue, garnering praise from Washington Post book critic Ron Charles, who described the Oxford American as a "regional magazine that defies the regional label." Across three issues that year, the magazine published excerpts of Jesmyn Ward's novel Sing, Unburied, Sing, which went on to win the 2017 National Book Award in Fiction. In March 2018, the Oxford American published its 100th issue, featuring an original cover painting by Wayne White.

See also
List of literary magazines

References

External links
 The Oxford American website
 Review of The Oxford American Book of Great Music Writing
 
 EditorsinLove

Visual arts magazines published in the United States
American Southern literary magazines
Quarterly magazines published in the United States
Magazines established in 1989
Magazines published in Arkansas
Magazines published in Mississippi
Mass media in Little Rock, Arkansas
University of Central Arkansas